Antelope Union High School is a high school outside of Wellton, Arizona. It is the only high school in the Antelope Union High School District and serves eastern Yuma County.

Notable alumni
 Aaron Simpson - 4-time Arizona Wrestling State Champion; professional mixed martial artist, formerly competing in the UFC

References

Public high schools in Arizona
Schools in Yuma County, Arizona
1952 establishments in Arizona
School districts established in 1952